John Simms (born circa 1903; date of death unknown) was an English footballer who played on the left-wing for Stoke, Leek Alexandra, Port Vale, Swansea Town, Winsford United, Macclesfield, Northwich Victoria and Stafford Rangers. He helped Port Vale to win the Third Division North title in 1929–30.

Career
Simms played for Burslem Juniors and Whitfield Colliery, before joining the Reserves at Stoke as an amateur in March 1924. He moved on to Leek Alexandra, before joining Port Vale as an amateur in June 1926. He signed as a professional in October that year, making his debut in a 4–0 defeat by Portsmouth at Fratton Park on 30 October. He scored his first goal for the "Valiants" on 6 November, in a 3–0 win over Oldham Athletic at The Old Recreation Ground. He ended the 1926–27 campaign with six goals in 25 appearances. He hit ten goals in 24 games in the 1927–28 season, including a brace against Barnsley and a hat-trick against West Bromwich Albion. He hit 12 goals in 35 matches in the 1928–29 relegation season, scoring all four goals in a 4–2 win over Nottingham Forest on 3 November. However, he was limited to three appearances in the 1929–30 campaign, as Vale won promotion back to the Second Division as champions of the Third Division North. He featured just once in the 1930–31 season, and was transferred to Swansea Town in May 1931. He joined Winsford United in August 1932, before signing with Macclesfield in October 1932. He was a first-team regular until missing the final two months of the season due to injury, scoring 11 goals in 21 Cheshire County League matches. Bill Owen was signed to replace him at outside-left, and Simms was allowed to join Northwich Victoria in June 1934. He moved on to Stafford Rangers three months later.

Career statistics
Source:

Honours
Port Vale
Football League Third Division North: 1929–30

References

Sportspeople from Burslem
English footballers
Association football midfielders
Stoke City F.C. players
Port Vale F.C. players
Swansea City A.F.C. players
Winsford United F.C. players
Macclesfield Town F.C. players
Northwich Victoria F.C. players
Stafford Rangers F.C. players
English Football League players
1900s births
Year of death missing